Charles John Klosterman (born 1972) is an American author and essayist whose work focuses on American popular culture. He has been a columnist for Esquire and ESPN.com and wrote "The Ethicist" column for The New York Times Magazine. Klosterman is the author of twelve books, including two novels and the essay collection Sex, Drugs, and Cocoa Puffs: A Low Culture Manifesto. He was awarded the ASCAP Deems Taylor award for music criticism in 2002.

Early life
Klosterman was born in Breckenridge, Minnesota, the youngest of seven children of Florence and William Klosterman. He is of German and Polish descent. He grew up on a farm in nearby Wyndmere, North Dakota, and was raised Roman Catholic. He graduated from Wyndmere High School in 1990 and from the University of North Dakota in 1994.

Career
After college, Klosterman was a journalist in Fargo, North Dakota, and later a reporter and arts critic for the Akron Beacon Journal in Akron, Ohio, before moving to New York City in 2002. From 2002 to 2006, Klosterman was a senior writer and columnist for Spin. He has written for GQ, Esquire, The New York Times Magazine, The Believer, The Guardian, and The Washington Post. 
His magazine work has been anthologized in Da Capo Press's Best Music Writing, Best American Travel Writing, and The Best American Nonrequired Reading. 
Though initially recognized for his rock writing, Klosterman has written extensively about sports and began contributing articles to ESPN's Page 2 on November 8, 2005.

In 2008, Klosterman spent the summer as the Picador Guest Professor for Literature at the Leipzig University's Institute for American Studies in Germany.

Klosterman was an original member of Grantland, a now-defunct sports and pop culture web site owned by ESPN and founded by Bill Simmons. Klosterman was a consulting editor. In 2020, he co-hosted a podcast titled "Music Exists" with Chris Ryan as part of The Ringer podcast network.

He also appeared in three episodes of the Adult Swim web feature Carl's Stone Cold Lock of the Century of the Week, discussing the year's football games as an animated version of himself and trying (unsuccessfully) to plug his book as Carl cuts him off each time. He quickly vanished after, with Carl giving the explanation of "He had to go do a book tour and also he didn't like how I kept calling him 'pencilneck'".

In 2012, Klosterman appeared in the documentary Shut Up and Play the Hits about musical group LCD Soundsystem; Klosterman's extended interview with the group's frontman James Murphy is woven throughout the film.

His eighth book, titled I Wear the Black Hat, was published in 2013. It focuses on the paradox of villainy within a heavily mediated culture.

In 2015, Klosterman appeared on episodes 6 and 7 of the first season of IFC show Documentary Now! as a music critic for the fictional band "The Blue Jean Committee".

His best-selling ninth book, But What If We're Wrong? Thinking About the Present As If It Were the Past, was published June 7, 2016. It visualizes the contemporary world as it will appear in the future to those who will perceive it as the distant past.

In 2021, Klosterman appeared on the podcast Storybound, backed by an original Storybound remix with Portico Quartet.

His 12th book, The Nineties, debuted at No. 2 on The New York Times nonfiction bestseller list on February 27, 2022.

Personal life
In 2009, Klosterman married journalist Melissa Maerz. They have two children.

Books
Klosterman is the author of 12 books and two sets of cards.

Non-fiction
 Fargo Rock City: A Heavy Metal Odyssey in Rural Nörth Daköta (2001), a humorous memoir/history on the phenomenon of glam metal
 Killing Yourself to Live: 85% of a True Story (2005), a road narrative focused on the relationship between rock music, mortality, and romantic love
 I Wear the Black Hat: Grappling with Villains (Real and Imagined) (2013)
 But What If We're Wrong? Thinking About the Present As If It Were the Past (2016)
 The Nineties (2022)

Essay collections
 Sex, Drugs, and Cocoa Puffs: A Low Culture Manifesto (2003), a best-selling collection of original pop culture essays
 Chuck Klosterman IV: A Decade of Curious People and Dangerous Ideas (2006), a collection of articles, previously published columns, and a semi-autobiographical novella
 Eating the Dinosaur (2009), an original collection of essays on media, technology, celebrity, and perception
 Chuck Klosterman X: A Highly Specific, Defiantly Incomplete History of the Early 21st Century (2017), a collection of previously published essays and features

Fiction
 Downtown Owl: A Novel (2008), a novel describing life in the fictional town of Owl, North Dakota
 The Visible Man: A Novel (2011), a novel about a man who uses invisibility to observe others
 Raised in Captivity (2019), a collection of 34 essayistic short stories, described as "fictional nonfiction"

Card sets
 HYPERtheticals: 50 Questions for Insane Conversations (2010), a set of 50 cards featuring hypothetical questions
 SUPERtheticals: 50 Questions for Strange Conversations (2020), another set of 50 cards featuring hypothetical questions

References

External links

 Chuck Klosterman at Simon & Schuster
 

1972 births
20th-century American journalists
20th-century American male writers
20th-century American non-fiction writers
21st-century American journalists
21st-century American male writers
21st-century American non-fiction writers
American essayists
American humorists
American male non-fiction writers
American music critics
American music journalists
American people of German descent
American people of Polish descent
ESPN.com
Esquire (magazine) people
Former Roman Catholics
Living people
People from Breckenridge, Minnesota
People from Richland County, North Dakota
Sportswriters from New York (state)
The New York Times Magazine
University of North Dakota alumni
Writers from Minnesota
Writers from New York City
Writers from North Dakota
Writers from Ohio